Livingston High School may refer to the following institutions in the United States:

Livingston High School (Alabama), Livingston, Alabama
Livingston High School (California), Livingston, California
Livingston High School (New Jersey), Livingston, New Jersey
Livingston High School (Texas), Livingston, Texas
Livingston Central High School in Smithland, Kentucky